Heparan sulfate 2-O-sulfotransferase 1 is an enzyme that in humans is encoded by the HS2ST1 gene.

Heparan sulfate biosynthetic enzymes are key components in generating a myriad of distinct heparan sulfate fine structures that carry out multiple biologic activities. This gene encodes heparan sulfate 2-O-sulfotransferase, a member of the heparan sulfate biosynthetic enzyme family. This family member transfers sulfate to the 2 position of the iduronic acid residue of heparan sulfate. 

The disruption of this gene resulted in no kidney formation in knockout embryonic mice, indicating that the absence of this enzyme may interfere with the signaling required for kidney formation.

References

Further reading